Cuvelai is a town and municipality in Cunene Province in Angola. The municipality had a population of 57,398 in 2014.

Namesake 

There are a number of towns in Angola with this name.

References 

Populated places in Cunene Province
Municipalities of Angola